The 1980 British Formula One Championship (formally the 1980 Aurora AFX F1 Championship) was the third season of the British Formula One Championship. It commenced on 4 April 1980 and ended on 5 October after twelve races. The Drivers' Championship was won by the Spaniard Emilio de Villota who drove a Williams FW07 entered by RAM Racing.

Teams and drivers

Results and standings

Races

Drivers' standings
Points are awarded to the top ten classified finishers using the following structure:

References

British Formula One Championship
British Formula One season
1980 in British motorsport